Nowatney is an unincorporated community in northern Hillsborough County, Florida,  United States.  The community is within the census-designated place of University. The ZIP code for the community is 33613.

Geography

Education
The community of Nowatney is served by Hillsborough County Schools.

References

External links
Nowatney profile from Hometown Locator

Unincorporated communities in Hillsborough County, Florida
Unincorporated communities in Florida